Homi Jehangir Bhabha,  (30 October 1909 – 24 January 1966) was an Indian nuclear physicist, founding director, and professor of physics at the Tata Institute of Fundamental Research (TIFR). Colloquially known as "Father of Indian nuclear programme", Bhabha was also the founding director of the Atomic Energy Establishment, Trombay (AEET) which is now named the Bhabha Atomic Research Centre in his honour. TIFR and AEET were the cornerstone of the Indian development of nuclear weapons which Bhabha also supervised as director.

Homi Bhabha was awarded the Adams Prize (1942) and Padma Bhushan (1954). He was also nominated for the Nobel Prize for Physics in 1951 and 1953–1956.

Bhabha died in the crash of Air India Flight 101 in 1966, at the age of 56.

Early life and education

Homi Jehangir Bhabha was born into a prominent wealthy Parsi family, through which he was related to businessmen Dinshaw Maneckji Petit. He was born on 30 October 1909. His father was Jehangir Hormusji Bhabha, a well-known Parsi lawyer. His mother was Meheren. He received his early studies at Bombay's Cathedral and John Connon School. He entered Elphinstone College at age 15 after passing his Senior Cambridge Examination with Honours.

He then attended the Royal Institute of Science in 1927 before joining Caius College of Cambridge University. This was due to the insistence of his father and his uncle Dorabji, who planned for Bhabha to obtain a degree in mechanical engineering from Cambridge and then return to India, where he would join the Tata Steel or Tata Steel Mills in Jamshedpur as a metallurgist.

Further studies 
Bhabha's father understood his son's predicament, and he along with his wife agreed to finance his studies in mathematics provided that he obtain first class on his Mechanical Sciences Tripos exam. Bhabha sat the Tripos exam in June 1930 and passed with first-class honours. Meanwhile, he worked at the Cavendish Laboratory while working towards his PhD degree in theoretical physics. At the time, the laboratory was the centre of several scientific breakthroughs. James Chadwick had discovered the neutron, John Cockcroft and Ernest Walton transmuted lithium with high-energy protons, and Patrick Blackett and Giuseppe Occhialini used cloud chambers to demonstrate the production of electron pairs and showers by gamma radiation.
During the 1931–1932 academic year, Bhabha was awarded the Salomons Studentship in Engineering. In 1932, he obtained his first class on his Mathematical Tripos and was awarded the Rouse Ball travelling studentship in mathematics.
During this time, nuclear physics was attracting the greatest minds and it was one of the most significant emerging fields as compared to theoretical physics, the opposition towards theoretical physics attacked the field because it was lenient towards theories rather than proving natural phenomenon through experiments. Conducting experiments on particles which also released enormous amounts of radiation, was a lifelong passion of Bhabha, and his leading-edge research and experiments brought great laurels to Indian physicists who particularly switched their fields to nuclear physics, one of the most notable being Piara Singh Gill.

Work in nuclear physics 
In January 1933, Bhabha received his doctorate in nuclear physics after publishing his first scientific paper, "The Absorption of Cosmic radiation". In the paper, Bhabha offered an explanation of the absorption features and electron shower production in cosmic rays. The paper helped him win the Isaac Newton Studentship in 1934, which he held for the next three years. The following year, he completed his doctoral studies in theoretical physics under Ralph H. Fowler. During his studentship, he split his time working at Cambridge and with Niels Bohr in Copenhagen. In 1935, Bhabha published a paper in the Proceedings of the Royal Society, Series A, in which he first calculated the cross-section of electron-positron scattering. Electron-positron scattering was later named Bhabha scattering, in honour of his contributions to the field.

In 1936, with Walter Heitler, he co-authored a paper, "The Passage of Fast Electrons and the Theory of Cosmic Showers" in the Proceedings of the Royal Society, Series A, in which they used their theory to describe how primary cosmic rays from outer space interact with the upper atmosphere to produce particles observed at the ground level. Bhabha and Heitler then made numerical estimates of the number of electrons in the cascade process at different altitudes for different electron initiation energies. The calculations agreed with the experimental observations of cosmic ray showers made by Bruno Rossi and Pierre Victor Auger a few years before. Bhabha later concluded that observations of the properties of such particles would lead to the straightforward experimental verification of Albert Einstein's theory of relativity. In 1937, Bhabha was awarded the Senior Studentship of the 1851 exhibition, which helped him continue his work at Cambridge until the outbreak of World War II in 1939.

Career
Starting his nuclear physics career in Britain, Bhabha had returned to India for his annual vacation before the start of World War II in September 1939. War prompted him to remain in India and he accepted a post of reader in physics at the Indian Institute of Science in Bengaluru, headed by Nobel laureate C.V. Raman. During this time, Bhabha played a key role in convincing the Congress Party's senior leaders, most notably Jawaharlal Nehru who later served as India's first Prime Minister, to start the ambitious nuclear programme. As part of this vision, Bhabha established the Cosmic Ray Research Unit at the institute and began to work on the theory of point particles movement, while independently conducting research on nuclear weapons in 1944. In 1945, he established the Tata Institute of Fundamental Research in Bombay, and the Atomic Energy Commission in 1948, serving as its first chairman. In 1948, Nehru led the appointment of Bhabha as the director of the nuclear program and tasked Bhabha to develop nuclear weapons soon after. In the 1950s, Bhabha represented India in IAEA conferences, and served as President of the United Nations Conference on the Peaceful Uses of Atomic Energy in Geneva, Switzerland in 1955. During this time, he intensified his lobbying for developing nuclear weapons. Soon after the Sino-Indo war, Bhabha aggressively and publicly began to call for nuclear weapons.

Bhabha gained international prominence after deriving a correct expression for the probability of scattering positrons by electrons, a process now known as Bhabha scattering. His major contribution included his work on Compton scattering, R-process, and the advancement of nuclear physics. He was awarded Padma Bhushan by the Government of India in 1954. He later served as the member of the Indian Cabinet's Scientific Advisory Committee and provided the pivotal role to Vikram Sarabhai to set up the Indian National Committee for Space Research. In January 1966, Bhabha died in a plane crash near Mont Blanc, while heading to Vienna, Austria to attend a meeting of the International Atomic Energy Agency's Scientific Advisory Committee.

Atomic energy in India

When Homi Jehangir Bhabha was working at the Indian Institute of Science, there was no institute in India which had the necessary facilities for original work in nuclear physics, cosmic rays, high energy physics, and other frontiers of knowledge in physics. This prompted him to send a proposal in March 1944 to the Sir Dorabji Tata Trust for establishing a vigorous school of research in fundamental physics. In his proposal he wrote:

The trustees of Sir Dorabji Jamsetji, Tata Trust, decided to accept Bhabha's proposal and financial responsibility for starting the Institute in April 1944. Bombay was chosen as the location as the Government of Bombay showed interest in becoming a joint founder of the proposed institute. In 1948, the institute was moved into the old buildings of the Royal Yacht club.

When Bhabha realised that technology development for the atomic energy programme could no longer be carried out within TIFR he proposed to the government to build a new laboratory entirely devoted to this purpose. For this purpose,  of land was acquired at Trombay from the Bombay Government. Thus the Atomic Energy Establishment Trombay (AEET) started functioning in 1954. The same year the Department of Atomic Energy (DAE) was also established. He represented India in International Atomic Energy Forums, and as President of the United Nations Conference on the Peaceful Uses of Atomic Energy, in Geneva, Switzerland in 1955. He was elected a Foreign Honorary Member of the American Academy of Arts and Sciences in 1958.

Nuclear power programme
Bhabha is generally acknowledged as the father of Indian nuclear power. Moreover, he is credited with formulating a strategy of focussing on extracting power from the country's vast thorium reserves rather than its meagre uranium reserves. This thorium focused strategy was in marked contrast to all other countries in the world. The approach proposed by Bhabha to achieve this strategic objective became India's three-stage nuclear power programme.

Bhabha paraphrased the three-stage approach as follows:

Death
Bhabha died when Air India Flight 101 crashed near Mont Blanc on 24 January 1966. A misunderstanding between Geneva Airport and the pilot about the aircraft position near the mountain is the official reason of the crash.

Assassination claims
Many possible theories have been advanced for the air crash, including a claim the Central Intelligence Agency (CIA) was involved in paralysing India's nuclear program. An Indian diplomatic bag containing calendars and a personal letter was recovered near the crash site in 2012.

Gregory Douglas, a journalist, conspiracy theorist, forger, and holocaust denier who claimed to have conducted telephone conversations with former CIA operative Robert Crowley in 1993, published a book called Conversations with the Crow in 2013. Douglas wrote that Crowley said the CIA was responsible for assassinating Homi Bhabha, as well as Indian Prime Minister Lal Bahadur Shastri in 1966, thirteen days apart, to thwart India's nuclear programme. According to Douglas, Crowley said that a bomb in the cargo section of the plane exploded mid-air, bringing down the commercial Boeing 707 airliner in Alps with few traces, saying "We could have blown it up over Vienna but we decided the high mountains were much better for the bits and pieces to come down on". The Indian media proceeded to report on these claims largely unquestioned.

Legacy
 
After his death, the Atomic Energy Establishment at Mumbai was renamed the Bhabha Atomic Research Centre in his honour.
In addition to being an able scientist and administrator, Bhabha was also a painter and a classical music and opera enthusiast, besides being an amateur botanist.  He is one of the most prominent scientists that India has ever had. Bhabha also encouraged research in electronics, space science, radio astronomy and microbiology.

The famed radio telescope in Ooty, India was his initiative, and it became a reality in 1970. The Homi Bhabha Fellowship Council has been giving Homi Bhabha Fellowships since 1967. Other noted institutions in his name are the Homi Bhabha National Institute, an Indian-deemed university and the Homi Bhabha Centre for Science Education, Mumbai, India.

At Bhabha's death, his estate including Mehrangir, the sprawling colonial bungalow at Malabar Hill where he spent most of his life, was inherited by his brother Jamshed Bhabha. Jamshed, an avid patron of arts and culture, bequeathed the bungalow and its contents to the National Centre for the Performing Arts, which auctioned the property for Rs 372 crores in 2014 to raise funds for upkeep and development of the centre. The bungalow was demolished in June 2016 by the owner, Smita-Crishna Godrej of the Godrej family, despite some efforts to have it preserved as a memorial to Homi Bhabha.

In popular culture 
Rocket Boys (2022) is a web series inspired by the lives of Homi J. Bhabha, Vikram Sarabhai and A. P. J. Abdul Kalam.

See also
India's three-stage nuclear power programme
Abdul Qadeer Khan
Bertrand Goldschmidt 
Deng Jiaxian 
Igor Kurchatov
J. Robert Oppenheimer
William Penney, Baron Penney

References

Bibliography

External links

 Annotated Bibliography for Homi J. Bhabha from the Alsos Digital Library for Nuclear Issues.
 The Woodrow Wilson Center's Nuclear Proliferation International History Project. NPIHP has a series of primary source documents about and by Homi Bhabha.
 
 
 

1909 births
1966 deaths
Parsi people
Parsi people from Mumbai
Alumni of the University of Cambridge
Cathedral and John Connon School alumni
Indian nuclear physicists
Fellows of the Royal Society
Fellows of the Indian National Science Academy
Fellows of the American Academy of Arts and Sciences
Foreign associates of the National Academy of Sciences
Nuclear history of India
Academic staff of the Indian Institute of Science
20th-century Indian physicists
Recipients of the Padma Bhushan in science & engineering
Scientists from Mumbai
Victims of aviation accidents or incidents in France
Victims of aviation accidents or incidents in Italy
Victims of aviation accidents or incidents in 1966
Conspiracy theories in India
Death conspiracy theories
Presidents of the International Union of Pure and Applied Physics